Minentaucher is the German term for mine clearance divers. The Minentaucherkompanie is a specialist unit within the German Navy responsible for underwater tasks including removing or salvaging underwater munitions such as mines and for servicing underwater drones. It is part of the Sea Battalion and is based in Eckernförde.

Minentaucherkompanie
The mine clearance diver company consists of soldiers at its headquarters in Eckenförde and those assigned to various German navy vessels. It primarily operates in German territorial waters such as the Baltic Sea, clearing naval mines and other hazards. It also supports search and recovery operations involving sunken ships, submarines and airplanes. In autumn 1985 the unit saw its first overseas engagement, clearing freshly laid mines in the Suez Canal. It has since served in several parts of the world as a part of NATO military deployments and exercises.

References

See also
 - Australian Navy Clearance Divers
 - US Navy, 1943–1967
 is Norway's Clearance Diver force.

Armed forces diving
Military engineering
Military units and formations of the German Navy